The Bhojpuri region or Bhojpur is an area encompassing parts of the Indian states of Bihar, Uttar Pradesh, Madhya Pradesh and Jharkhand, and the Madhesh, Gandaki and Lumbini provinces of Nepal, where the Bhojpuri language is spoken as a mother tongue.

History

Pre-history and Antiquity 
The earliest known evidence of Human settlement in the region are the Cave painting of Kiamur and Mirzapur. The first Neolithic settlement found in this region is in Chirand of Saran, which dates back 2500-1500 B.C. and is contemporary to the Harrapans.

Etymology
The Bhojpuri region received its name after the town of Bhojpur (Arrah), the headquarters of the Ujjainiya Rajputs of the former Shahabad district of Bihar.

Culture
The economic and industrial growth of this region had been greatly hindered because of caste-guided political in-fighting and a huge population.
The culture of Bhojpur is also very much present today in Trinidad and Tobago, Guyana, Suriname, Fiji, Mauritius, and South Africa, due to the many Indian indentured laborers who were sent there by the ruling British in the mid 19th century to the early 20th century, and were from the Purvanchal-Bhojpur region.

Language

Bhojpuri is a descendant of Magadhi Prakrit which started taking in shape during the reign of the Vardhana dynasty. The earliest form of Bhojpuri can be traced in the Siddha Sahitya and Charyapada as early as 7th century A.D. It is an eastern Indo-Aryan language and one of the easternmost branches of the Indo-European language family. The Bhojpuri variant of Kaithi is the indigenous script of Bhojpuri language.

Festivals
Chhath Puja and Durga Puja are the biggest festivals of Bhojpuri region.

Other important festivals include Phagwah, Saraswati Puja, Deepavali, Dussehra, Vishwakarma Puja, Ramnavami, Teej, Jitiya, Janmashtami, Anant Chaturdashi, Dev Deepawali, Pidiya, Bahura, Godhan, Chauk Chanda, Raksha Bandhan, Nag Nathaiya, Naga Panchami, Karma, etc.

Districts

Bhojpuri language is spoken in the districts of Western Bihar and Eastern Uttar Pradesh which is called Purvanchal.

Bihar

Patna division: Bhojpur district, Buxar district, Kaimur district and Rohtas district.

Saran division: Saran district, Siwan district, Gopalganj district.

Tirhut division: West Champaran district, East Champaran district

Uttar Pradesh

Varanasi division: Chandauli district, Ghazipur district, Jaunpur district, Varanasi district.

Gorakhpur division: Deoria district, Gorakhpur district, Kushinagar district, Maharajganj district.

Azamgarh division: Azamgarh district, Ballia district, Mau district.

Mirzapur division: Mirzapur district, Sant Ravidas Nagar district, Sonbhadra district.

Basti division: Sant Kabir Nagar district, Siddharthnagar district, Basti district

Religion 

According to the 2011 Census, Hindus form the majority in the Bhojpuri region, with 85.33% adhering to Hinduism. Islam is practiced by 14.5% of the population, while 0.52% profess other religions.

See also
 Bhojpuri

References

Regions of Bihar
Regions of India